Edward Lowenstern  Yencken (13 February 1854 – 7 September 1932) was an Australian hardware merchant. Yencken was born in Brixton, Surrey, England and died in Toorak, Melbourne, Victoria.

See also

References

Australian people of English descent
Hardware merchants
1854 births
1932 deaths